Forest Road Primitive Methodist church was built on Forest Road in Nottingham in 1874.

History

The building was constructed in 1874 to designs by the local architect Richard Charles Sutton. The construction cost around £3,000 and the downturn in the local economy meant that it took over 10 years to complete the building.

It was later acquired by the Nottingham Christadelphians.

References

Churches completed in 1874
Methodist churches in Nottingham
Former Methodist churches in the United Kingdom
Christadelphianism